Kaitaia Airport  is an airport located in Kaitaia, in the Northland Region of New Zealand. It is 320 km from Auckland. Barrier Air operates daily flights to and from Auckland Airport.

History

On 13 June 2005, Kaitaia Airport received an injection of $333,850 to upgrade its runway facilities so that it could accommodate larger aircraft. The Far North District Council approved loan funding for Kaitaia Airport's project to allow it to accommodate aircraft with a pavement classification number of 15,000 kg in mainwheel axle weight. This upgrade would allow Air New Zealand to fly into Kaitaia with its Bombardier and ATR 72-500 aircraft. During the project, $1.4 million invested into the airport was to provide larger hardstand areas and better terminal facilities.

At the end of April 2015, Air New Zealand discontinued its service between Kaitaia and Auckland. Barrier Air began operating the route with a Cessna Caravan from 28 April 2015.

Aircraft transit
Kaitaia Airport is the most northern airfield in New Zealand that has fuel available. It has a long and smooth runway, the longest in Northland, and is used by light aircraft, as well as private aircraft such as the Gulfstream V.
 
852 km to the north-west of Kaitaia is Norfolk Island Airport, from which it is 754 km to Nouméa in New Caledonia, or 900 km to Lord Howe Island, which can be used as a stepping stone to the Australian mainland. These distances are within the range of many light aircraft fitted with long range tanks, while the direct distances are usually used with the larger private aircraft which are able to land at Kaitaia Airport.  From New Caledonia other Pacific Islands such as Vanuatu and Fiji are within range and can be used as further 'stepping stones' to the other South Pacific and North Pacific destinations.

Airlines and destinations

	
Kaitaia Airport previously received Beechcraft 1900Ds, operated by Eagle Air on behalf of Air New Zealand, twice daily Monday–Friday and daily Saturday–Sunday. This route was taken over by Barrier Air from 28 April 2015. Other airlines also expressed interest in operating the route, including Tauranga-based Sunair.

The airport is home to the Kaitaia Aero Club, which operates a small flight school from its hangar.

See also

 List of airports in New Zealand
 List of airlines of New Zealand
 Transport in New Zealand

References

External links
Far North Holdings Ltd.
About Far North Holdings Ltd.

Airports in New Zealand
Far North District
Transport buildings and structures in the Northland Region
Transport in the Northland Region